Thomas Lewis (May 8, 1749 – September 9, 1809) was an American Revolutionary War veteran who figured prominently in the early development of Lexington, Kentucky and the Commonwealth of Kentucky. He administered the oath of office to Kentucky's first governor, Isaac Shelby, in 1792.

Born in Fairfax, Virginia, Lewis served with the Eleventh Virginia during the Revolutionary War and retired with the rank of colonel in February 1781. Lewis had also served in the Virginia House of Burgesses and was on the Committee of Safety of the Colonies.

After moving to Kentucky, Lewis served as a delegate to the convention in Danville that adopted the first Constitution of Kentucky in 1792. He also represented Fayette County in the first Kentucky State Senate.

According to historian and author Benjamin F. Van Meter, Lewis was "possessed of considerable means when he came to Kentucky, consisting of money, slaves and livestock. He made extensive investments in lands, and soon became one of the influential and wealthy men of this region of the country. He was a very intelligent, enterprising old-fashioned Kentucky gentleman, who kept his well-trained body-servant close at hand wherever he went; was noted, like most of the gentlemen of this region and of Virginia in that day, for hospitality and high living."

Lewis Manor

His home in Lexington, Lewis Manor (circa 1800), is listed on the National Register of Historic Places. Although urban development has encroached upon Lewis Manor's former rural surroundings, the historic one-story Federal house has been beautifully restored in recent years and remains in excellent condition.

Kentucky Historical Marker 1558, placed along Villey Road between Leestown Pike and Old Frankfort Pike, is titled "Early Land Grant" and reads as follows: "This spring 900 feet to the west was discovered in 1775 by Joseph Lindsay, who was killed at the Battle of Blue Licks. Spring and surrounding 2,000 acres were later surveyed for Evan Shelby, father of the first governor of Kentucky. The house on this site, 'Lewis Manor', was built by Thomas Lewis, circa 1800. Presented by Lexington-Fayette County Historic Commission."

An image of Lewis Manor is one of the homes featured on the cover of Antebellum Architecture of Kentucky, a book by Clay Lancaster.

Personal life

Lewis and his wife, Elizabeth Payne Lewis, had 13 children.

One son, Alpheus Lewis (March 28, 1799 – April 6, 1865), a farmer and whiskey distiller, built the Oakwood estate (circa 1820) near Winchester, Kentucky. Oakwood is listed on the National Register of Historic Places.

A daughter of Lewis, Sarah (Sallie) Ann Lewis (December 14, 1776 – July 7, 1867) married Green Clay, a militia general and wealthy landowner. They had six children, including Kentucky congressman and Russian diplomat, Cassius Marcellus Clay (1810–1903). Their home near Richmond, Kentucky, Clermont, was added to and renamed White Hall by Cassius. The 44-room Italianate mansion is now a state historic site.

Another daughter, Anne Nancy Conyers Payne Lewis (August 18, 1774 – November 17, 1835) married General James Garrard, whose father was twice governor of Kentucky.

Lewis died on September 9, 1809, at Olympia Springs in Bath County, Kentucky, while on an intended trip to Virginia. His body was returned to Lexington and buried near Lewis Manor.

References

Bibliography

People of Virginia in the American Revolution
Kentucky state senators
1749 births
1809 deaths
Politicians from Fairfax, Virginia
Virginia colonial people
History of Lexington, Kentucky
Burials in Kentucky